Drew & Shannon Live was a topical entertainment show, airing weekday afternoons (4.30-6pm) on FOUR, and co-hosted by Drew Neemia and Shannon Ryan. It was aimed to be a daily wrap of relatable entertainment for an 18- to 49-year-old audience. Content is audience-focused and entertainment-driven, with a focus on eclecticism, featuring segments covering film, gaming, TV, music, fashion, sport, technology, among others.

Drew and Shannon Live posted on Facebook and Twitter a daily topic. Drew and Shannon addressed the topic and people's opinions throughout the show.

It was service-driven, keeping the audience informed and entertained by also allowing them to engage both with the show and each other. Content is syndicated online and linked with social media (Facebook, Twitter feeds) allowing the establishment of member groups where interested viewers can connect with other viewers and contribute to the show's content. Other reviews/guests replaced either Drew or Shannon after a break or a music video.

The show was repeated on C4 at 7.30pm.

The show often had Tumehe Rongonui and/or Sharyn Wakefield (now Sharyn Casey) covering for Drew and/or Shannon during their absence.

In January 2012, the show was replaced by Four Live.

External links
 Drew & Shannon Live on Twitter
 Drew & Shannon Live on Facebook
 Drew & Shannon Live on FOUR.co.nz

Four (New Zealand TV channel) original programming
2011 New Zealand television series debuts
2012 New Zealand television series endings